Aba-wa is a village in the Bago Division of south-east Myanmar.

See also
List of cities, towns and villages in Burma: A

External links
MSN Encarta map
Satellite image at Maplandia.com

Populated places in Bago Region